"Kiss and Tell" is a song by You Me at Six, released as a single on 7 September 2009 through Virgin. The single was released on CD, digital download and 7" vinyl, with the former two having an additional track, a cover of Lady Gaga's "Poker Face". It would later feature on the deluxe edition of Take Off Your Colours. The song is a first person narrative about a girl that everybody wants, and how she has a promiscuous nature and "Kisses and Tells". The song received considerable airplay across Radio 1 as well as topping both the Kerrang! and NME charts. In support of the single, the band played a short five date headline tour in intimate venues, including the London Camden Underworld, as well as two in-store shows. It also gained much media coverage. "Kiss and Tell" peaked at number 42 in the UK charts.

Music video
The music video features the band at a house party performing with various shots of people partying.

Track listing

Chart performance

Personnel
 Josh Franceschi - Lead vocals
 Chris Miller - Lead guitar
 Max Heyler - Rhythm Guitar 
 Matt Barnes - Bass
 Dan Flint - Drums / Percussion

References

Songs about kissing
2009 singles
2009 songs
You Me at Six songs

de:You Me at Six
nl:You Me At Six
pl:You Me at Six
sv:You Me at Six